Wallace State Community College (formally George C Wallace State Community College) is a public community college in Hanceville, Alabama. Founded in 1966 as the George C. Wallace State Trade School of Cullman County, the college currently enrolls approximately 6,000 students and offers more than 50 associate degree and certificate programs in academic, health, and technical programs.

History 
The college was founded in 1966. It is named for former Alabama governor George C. Wallace, who greatly expanded Alabama's community college system.

Campus 
The college campus is in Hanceville, Alabama. The college also has an Academic Center and a Technical Center in Oneonta, AL. The Oneonta Center was opened in 2016.

Organization and administration 
Wallace State maintains a partnership with Athens State University, which enables students to complete junior- and senior-level classes leading to a baccalaureate degree, all on the Wallace State campus.

Academics  
Wallace State is accredited by the Commission on Colleges of the Southern Association of Colleges and Schools to award the Associate in Arts, Associate in Science, and Associate in Applied Science degrees. Many programs have additional accreditation from organizations appropriate to the particular disciplines.

Student life

Sports 
School sports include baseball, basketball, cheerleading, golf, tennis, softball, volleyball, and intramurals.

Notable alumni

 Marcus Brimage (attended), professional mixed martial artist
 Lester "Bubba" Carpenter, member of the Mississippi House of Representatives; First District of Mississippi
 Jake Elmore, baseball player
Mickey Gorka (born 1972), Israeli basketball player and coach
 Derek Holland, baseball player
 Fredrik Jacobson (attended), golf player, currently on the PGA tour 
 Craig Kimbrel, baseball player
 Kip Moore, country music singer
 Lee Moore, professional basketball player
Adrian Pledger (born 1976), basketball player
 Jimi Westbrook, musician, of Little Big Town
 Brett Wetterich (attended), golf player, currently on the PGA tour
 Zelous Wheeler, baseball player

References

External links
Official website

 
Buildings and structures in Cullman County, Alabama
Community colleges in Alabama
Education in Cullman County, Alabama
Universities and colleges accredited by the Southern Association of Colleges and Schools
NJCAA athletics
1966 establishments in Alabama
George Wallace